Petr Šenkeřík (born 13 March 1991) is a Czech professional ice hockey forward who currently plays with Motor České Budějovice in the Czech Extraliga (ELH).

References

External links

1991 births
Living people
HC Berounští Medvědi players
Columbus Cottonmouths (SPHL) players
Czech ice hockey forwards
Czech expatriate ice hockey players in Canada
Czech expatriate ice hockey players in the United States
Czech expatriate sportspeople in Ukraine
HC Karlovy Vary players
HC Kometa Brno players
Kootenay Ice players
Motor České Budějovice players
Orli Znojmo players
Prince George Cougars players
HC Slavia Praha players
HC Vítkovice players
Sportspeople from Zlín
PSG Berani Zlín players